Newchurch is a small rural village in Powys, Wales, centred around St Mary's Church.

The church of St Mary is Grade II listed, and was rebuilt in 1856–57. Francis Kilvert, the Welsh clergyman and diarist, was a frequent visitor. The adjoining Great House and its barn are also Grade II listed. Great House is described by Cadw as a "late C15 cruck-framed hall house, notable for the great span of its trusses, at 28ft the widest yet recorded in Wales."

Notes

Villages in Powys